The 1981–82 Edmonton Oilers season was the Oilers' third season in the NHL, as they finished with a franchise record 48 wins and 111 points, and won the Smythe Division for the first time in team history. The Oilers set an NHL record with 417 goals, the first time in NHL history that a team finished with over 400 goals.

Wayne Gretzky continued rewriting the record books, scoring an NHL record 92 goals, which included 50 goals in 39 games, also an NHL record. Gretzky's 212 points was also a record, and it was the first time in NHL history that a player had over 200 points, as he won his third Hart Memorial Trophy and his second Art Ross Trophy.

Mark Messier broke the 50 goal plateau for the first time in his career, while Glenn Anderson got 105 points. Paul Coffey led the defense with 89 points.

In goal, Grant Fuhr became the starting goalie, and would break the Oilers franchise record for wins in a season with 28. He also led the club with a 3.31 GAA and a .898 save percentage.

For the first time in their short NHL history, the Oilers entered the Stanley Cup Playoffs as a clear favorite to make a deep postseason run. Going into the playoffs, the Oilers faced the Los Angeles Kings, and after splitting the first 2 games, the Oilers held a 5–0 lead on the Kings heading into the 3rd period of game 3. Los Angeles came back to tie the game 5–5, before completing the comeback with an overtime goal, taking a 2–1 series lead. The game came to be known as the Miracle on Manchester. Edmonton came back to tie the series in game 4, but the Kings eliminated Edmonton in game 5, shocking the hockey world, and ending the Oilers season a lot sooner than expected.

Season standings

Schedule and results

Playoffs

Season stats

Scoring leaders

Goaltending

Playoff stats

Scoring leaders

Goaltending

Awards and records

Awards
 Art Ross Trophy: Wayne Gretzky
 Associated Press Athlete of the Year: Wayne Gretzky
 Hart Memorial Trophy: Wayne Gretzky
 Lou Marsh Trophy: Wayne Gretzky
 Lester B. Pearson Award: Wayne Gretzky
 NHL Plus/Minus Award: Wayne Gretzky
 First NHL All-Star team: Wayne Gretzky and Mark Messier
 Second NHL All-Star team: Grant Fuhr and Paul Coffey

Records
417: An NHL team record for most goals in a single season.
400: A new NHL team record for most goals in a single season on March 26, 1982.
212: An NHL record for most points in a single season by Wayne Gretzky.
165: A new NHL record for most points in a single season by Wayne Gretzky on February 19, 1982.
200: First NHL player to hit a 200-point-milestone by Wayne Gretzky on March 25, 1982.
120: An NHL record for most assists in a single season by Wayne Gretzky.
110: A new NHL record for most assists in a single season by Wayne Gretzky on March 19, 1982.
92: An NHL record for most goals in a single season by Wayne Gretzky.
77: A new NHL record for most goals in a single season by Wayne Gretzky on February 24, 1982.
68: An NHL record for most even strength goals in a single season by Wayne Gretzky.
53: A new NHL record for most even strength goals in a single season by Wayne Gretzky on February 17, 1982.

Milestones

Transactions

Trades

* Later traded to the Minnesota North Stars

Free agents

Draft picks
Edmonton's draft picks at the 1981 NHL Entry Draft

References

National Hockey League Guide & Record Book 2007

 

Edmonton Oilers season, 1981-82
Edmon
Edmonton Oilers seasons
Smythe Division champion seasons